Bolinopsidae is a family of ctenophores.

Taxonomy 
The family contains three genera with the following species:

Genus Bolinopsis
Bolinopsis ashleyi Gershwin, Zeidler & Davie, 2010
Bolinopsis chuni (von Lendenfeld, 1884)
Bolinopsis elegans (Mertens, 1833)
Bolinopsis indosinensis Dawydoff, 1946
Bolinopsis infundibulum (Müller, 1776)
Bolinopsis microptera (Agassiz, 1865)
Bolinopsis mikado Moser, 1908
Bolinopsis ovalis (Bigelow, 1904)
Bolinopsis rubripunctata Tokioka 1964
Bolinopsis vitrea (Agassiz, 1860)

Genus Lesueuria
 Lesueuria hyboptera Agassiz, 1865
 Lesueuria pinnata Ralph and Kaberry, 1950
 Lesueuria tiedemanni (Eschscholtz, 1829)
 Lesueuria vitrea Milne Edwards, 1841

Genus Mnemiopsis
Mnemiopsis leidyi A. Agassiz, 1865

References

 
Animal families